Steven Hromjak (born April 25, 1930) is an American cyclist. He competed in two events at the 1952 Summer Olympics.

References

1930 births
Living people
American male cyclists
Olympic cyclists of the United States
Cyclists at the 1952 Summer Olympics
Sportspeople from Cleveland
American track cyclists